Abu 'Abd Allah Muhammad ibn Hudhayl al-Saghir (1208 in la Vall d'Alcalà, Alicante – 1276 Alcoi), popularly known as Al-Azraq ("the Blue" – referring to his eyes), was an Arab Moorish commander in the Iberian Peninsula in the south of the Kingdom of Valencia.

After the conquest of the Kingdom of Valencia by James I of Aragon, Al-Azraq signed the Al-Azraq Treaty of 1245, a pact with the Aragonese king by which the Muslim commander could keep control of a series of fortifications including Polop (later the lordship of the Barons of Polop) in the valleys of Alcalá and Gallinera.

See also 
 Moors and Christians of Alcoy

References 

1208 births
1276 deaths
13th-century Arabs
13th-century people from al-Andalus
Generals of the medieval Islamic world
Medieval Arabs killed in battle
People of the Reconquista
Warsh recitation